Cyathea howeana  is a fern in the family Cyatheaceae. The specific epithet refers to Lord Howe Island, the locality in Australia to which it is endemic.

Description
The plant is a treefern with a trunk up to 3 m in height.

Distribution and habitat
The fern is endemic to Australia’s subtropical Lord Howe Island in the Tasman Sea. It is common on the slopes and summits of Mounts Gower and Lidgbird.

References

howeana
Endemic flora of Lord Howe Island
Ferns of Australia
Plants described in 1929
Taxa named by Karel Domin